Amado Ursua (born 13 September 1956) is a Mexican former professional boxer and WBC light flyweight champion.

Professional career
Amado won the Mexican National Light Flyweight title by upsetting veteran German Torres in a twelfth-round unanimous decision.

WBC Light Flyweight Championship
On February 6, 1982, in Panama City, Ursua won his WBC Light Flyweight title by upsetting a one loss Hilario Zapata by K.O. in the second round. Many had thought Amado did not have a chance against the Panamanian.

He would go on to lose his WBC title in a very controversial fifteen round Majority decision to Tadashi Tomori in Tokyo.

See also
List of Mexican boxing world champions
List of WBC world champions
List of light flyweight boxing champions

References

External links

Boxers from Mexico City
World Boxing Council champions
World light-flyweight boxing champions
Light-flyweight boxers
1956 births
Living people
Mexican male boxers